Spiva is a surname. Notable people with the surname include:

Andy Spiva (1955–1979), American football player
Derrick Spiva (born 1982), American conductor, composer, musician, and teacher
Tam Spiva (1932–2017), American television screenwriter